Paul Finsler (born 11 April 1894, in Heilbronn, Germany, died 29 April 1970 in Zurich, Switzerland) was a German and Swiss mathematician.

Finsler did his undergraduate studies at the Technische Hochschule Stuttgart, and his graduate studies at the University of Göttingen, where he received his Ph.D. in 1919 under the supervision of Constantin Carathéodory. He studied for his habilitation at the University of Cologne, receiving it in 1922. He joined the faculty of the University of Zurich in 1927, and was promoted to ordinary professor there in 1944.

Finsler's thesis work concerned differential geometry, and Finsler spaces were named after him by Élie Cartan in 1934. The Hadwiger–Finsler inequality, a relation between the side lengths and area of a triangle in the Euclidean plane, is named after Finsler and his co-author Hugo Hadwiger, as is the Finsler–Hadwiger theorem on a square derived from two other squares that share a vertex. Finsler is also known for his work on the foundations of mathematics, developing a non-well-founded set theory with which he hoped to resolve the contradictions implied by Russell's paradox.

Publications

 (Reprinted by Birkhäuser (1951))

 

Finsler: Aufsätze zur Mengenlehre. (ed. G. Unger) 1975.

References

Further reading
.

1894 births
1970 deaths
20th-century German mathematicians
Swiss mathematicians
Differential geometers
Set theorists
University of Stuttgart alumni
University of Göttingen alumni
University of Cologne alumni
Academic staff of the University of Zurich
People from Heilbronn
German emigrants to Switzerland